The Bhutia Horse is a breed of small mountain horse from Sikkim and the district of Darjeeling in northern India. It has some similarity to Mongolian and Tibetan breeds. The usual coat colours are bay and grey.

References

Horse breeds originating in India